Eva Lundqvist (born 16 December 1944) is a Swedish former tennis player.

A Federation Cup player for Sweden in 1966 and 1967, Lundqvist featured in a total of three ties, including a World Group 2nd round fixture against the United States, where she faced Billie Jean King in doubles. She was a doubles winner at the 1968 Swedish Open and reached the singles third round of the 1969 French Open.

Lundqvist, who adopted the name Wennerström after marriage, had a daughter named Nina who played professionally.

See also
List of Sweden Fed Cup team representatives

References

External links
 
 
 
  (duplicate)

1944 births
Living people
Swedish female tennis players